Rodrigo Alves Soares (born 26 December 1992) is a Brazilian professional footballer who plays as a right back.

Club career

Early career
Born on 26 December 1992 in Porangatu, Brazil, Rodrigo Alves Soares started playing football since he was a... toddler, just like all kids in his home country.
He was introduced to professional football at the age of 20, at União São João. He joined Santo André for a while, before signing for Grêmio Anápolis. With 14 matches and 1 goal to show for in 2014–15, he earned his ticket to European football.
He moved to Porto and played for their B team for two seasons. In 2017, he was loaned to Chaves for a semester, recording his first appearances in Primeira Liga. In the following season, Rodrigo was on the lookout for a top-tier team that would grant him opportunities to show his worth. Desportivo das Aves came up with the offer.

C.D. Aves
In his first season at Desportivo das Aves, Rodrigo conjured up 1 goal and 2 assists in 33 encounters and contributed to his club's first ever silverware, the Taça de Portugal. The Brazilian had made his first step, but would definitely stand out in 2018–19.

He played in 41 matches, scored 4 goals, delivered 9 assists, got the award for Primeira Liga best full-back of the season and earned numerous awards on European level as well. His excellent season attracted interest and... suitors started gathering around. Porto and Sporting both moved to signing him, but PAOK were swift and secured the Brazilian's signature, bringing him to Thessaloniki.

PAOK
The right-back made 60 appearances across all competitions for Desportivo Aves in Portugal, registering five goals and six assists During the 2018-19 campaign. A day later he signed a three years contract with Greek champions PAOK for an undisclosed fee. On 6 June 2019, according to reports, Rodrigo Soares will arrive in Thessaloniki this afternoon to complete his PAOK transfer. A free agent after his contract with Desportivo Aves reached its completion, the 26-year-old defender initially held negotiations with AEK Athens, but he subsequently spoke with PAOK and made the decision to join the Thessaloniki-based club. After a good season in 2021-22 campaign and the departure of Matos, Rodrigo become a first team player under Pablo Garcia and won another title in his career. In Cup final PAOK faced Olympiacos and won 2–1 in a very passionate game.
Last year in his contract and PAOK in January 2022 decided to release Rodrigo victim of team renewal and new Technical Derector Jose Boto. 64 appearances across all competitions for PAOK and strike 1 goal against Lamia FC.

Return to Brazil
In January 2022 Rodrigo signed a deal with Juventude for one year.

Career statistics

Club

Honours

Club
Porto B
LigaPro: 2015–16

C.D. Aves
Taça de Portugal: 2017–18
PAOK
Greek Cup: 2020–21

References

External links

1992 births
Living people
Brazilian footballers
Association football defenders
União São João Esporte Clube players
Esporte Clube Santo André players
FC Porto B players
Brazilian expatriate footballers
Expatriate footballers in Portugal
Expatriate footballers in Greece
Liga Portugal 2 players
Super League Greece players
Campeonato Brasileiro Série A players
G.D. Chaves players
Primeira Liga players
C.D. Aves players
PAOK FC players
Esporte Clube Juventude players